Drui is a dance practiced by the Kanak peoples of New Caledonia.

References

Kanak culture